Shahriyor Daminov (born 1 January 1997) is a Tajikistani sprint canoer. He was the silver medalist at the 2017 Asian Championships and at the 2018 Asian Games in the men's sprint C-1 1000 metres event. In 2018, he claimed the title at the Asian Championships in the C-1 1000 metres and also won the bronze in the C-4 1000 metres event.

References 

1997 births
Living people
People from Dushanbe
Tajikistani male canoeists
Canoeists at the 2014 Asian Games
Canoeists at the 2018 Asian Games
Asian Games silver medalists for Tajikistan
Asian Games medalists in canoeing
Medalists at the 2018 Asian Games